The prebendaries of Aylesbury can be traced back to Ralph in 1092. The prebend of Aylesbury was attached to the See of Lincoln as early as 1092. An early account states "It is said that a Bishop of Lincoln, desired by the Pope, give the Personage of Aylesbury to a stranger, a kinsman of his, found means to make it a Prebend, and to incorporate it to Lincoln Church." So in the reign of Edward III the church of St. Mary the Virgin, Aylesbury was part of the Deanery of Lincoln, and a separate stall in that Cathedral was set aside for the Dean.

Most prebends disappeared in 1547, when nearly all collegiate churches in England were dissolved by the Act for the Dissolution of Collegiate Churches and Chantries of that year, as part of the English Reformation. Aylesbury seems to have been an exception until 1842 when after the death of Dr. Pretyman an Honorary Canon was appointed in his stead.

List of prebendaries of Aylesbury

Notes

References
 
 
 

Diocese of Lincoln